Iulius Severianus was a Latin rhetor who lived in the 5th century AD. He wrote a book entitled Praecepta artis rhetoricae. One of the manuscripts (Cod. Bodmer 146, 10th century) was owned by Petrarch, who studied and commented on it with many glossa.

References

External links
Rhetores Latini minores, Karl Halm (ed.), Lipsiae in aedibus B. G. Teubneri, 1863, pp. 353-370.

Ancient Roman rhetoricians
5th-century Romans